Tonya Slacanin, (born March 28, 1968), formerly known as "Teee" Williams or "Teee" Sanders, is a retired female volleyball player from the United States, who won the bronze medal with the USA National Team at the 1992 Summer Olympics in Barcelona, Spain. She also competed at the 1996 Summer Olympics, finishing in seventh place.  She played college women's volleyball with the Hawaii Rainbow Wahine volleyball team.

While playing collegiately at the University of Hawaii, she married an Army Soldier by the last name Sanders, and her name became Teee Williams-Sanders, the marriage ended in divorce with Williams taking back her maiden name. She has since remarried, and is currently Tonya Slacanin.

She was born in Los Angeles, California.

She played for Orion Sesto San Giovanni Milano in the Italian championship il 1992-93 and then for PVF Parmalat Matera from 1996 to 1998. 
She won the European "CEV-Cup" in 1994 with the German team Munster, the national indoor Championship and Cup title in Germany in 2004 with USC Münster as well as the German beachvolleyball title in 2003 partnering Ines Pianka.

International competitions
1990 – Goodwill Games
1990 – World Championships (bronze)
1991 – World Cup
1992 – Summer Olympics (bronze)
1992 – FIVB Super Four (bronze)
1993 – FIVB Grand Champions Cup
1994 – World Grand Prix
1994 – World Championship
1995 – Pan American Games (silver)
1995 – Canada Cup (gold)
1995 – World Grand Prix (gold)

References

External links
 
 
 
 
 Teee Williams at The Washington Post
 
 "'Teee' time remarkable one for UH volleyball" at the Honolulu Advertiser
·"Williams is sky high for Games" at the Honolulu Star-Bulletin

1968 births
Living people
American women's volleyball players
Volleyball players at the 1992 Summer Olympics
Volleyball players at the 1996 Summer Olympics
Olympic bronze medalists for the United States in volleyball
Volleyball players from Los Angeles
Hawaii Rainbow Wahine volleyball players
Medalists at the 1992 Summer Olympics
Outside hitters
African-American volleyball players
Competitors at the 1990 Goodwill Games
21st-century African-American people
21st-century African-American women
20th-century African-American sportspeople
20th-century African-American women
20th-century African-American people
Pan American Games medalists in volleyball
Pan American Games silver medalists for the United States
Medalists at the 1995 Pan American Games